The Corrections is a 2001 novel by American author Jonathan Franzen. It revolves around the troubles of an elderly Midwestern couple and their three adult children, tracing their lives from the mid-20th century to "one last Christmas" together near the turn of the millennium. The novel was awarded the National Book Award in 2001 and the James Tait Black Memorial Prize in 2002.

The Corrections was published to wide acclaim from literary critics for its characterization and prose. While the novel's release preceded the September 11 terrorist attacks by ten days, many have interpreted The Corrections as having prescient insight into the major concerns and general mood of post-9/11 American life, and it has been listed in multiple publications as one of the greatest novels of the 21st century.

Plot summary
The novel shifts back and forth through the late 20th century, intermittently following spouses Alfred and Enid Lambert as they raise their children Gary, Chip, and Denise in the traditional Midwestern suburb of St. Jude, and the lives of each family member as the three children grow up, distancing themselves and living on the East Coast. Alfred, a rigid and strict patriarch who worked as a railroad engineer, has developed Parkinson's and shows increasingly unmanageable symptoms of dementia. Enid takes out her frustrations with him by attempting to impose her traditional judgments on her adult children's lives, to their annoyance.

Their eldest son, Gary, is a successful but increasingly depressive and alcoholic banker living in Philadelphia with his wife, Caroline, and their three young sons. When Enid attempts to persuade Gary to bring his family to St. Jude for Christmas, Caroline is reluctant, and turns Gary's sons against him and Enid, worsening his depressive tendencies. In return, Gary attempts to force his parents to move to Philadelphia so that Alfred may undergo an experimental neurological treatment that he and Denise learn about.

Also living in Philadelphia, their youngest child Denise finds growing success as an executive chef despite Enid's disapproval and persistent scrutiny of her personal life, and is commissioned to open a new restaurant. Simultaneously impulsive and a workaholic, Denise begins affairs with both her boss and his wife, and though the restaurant is successful, she is fired when this is discovered. Flashbacks to her childhood show her responding to her repressed upbringing by beginning an affair with one of her father's subordinates, a married railroad signals worker.

The middle son, Chip, is an unemployed academic living in New York City following his termination as a tenure-track university professor due to a sexual relationship with a student. Living on borrowed money from Denise, Chip works obsessively on a screenplay, but finds no success or motivation to pay off his debts. Following a rejection of his screenplay, Chip takes a job from his girlfriend's estranged husband Gitanas, a friendly but corrupt Lithuanian government official, later moving to Vilnius and working to defraud American investors over the Internet.

As Alfred's condition worsens, Enid attempts to manipulate all of her children into going to St. Jude for Christmas, with increasing desperation. Initially only Gary and Denise are present, Gary having failed to convince his wife or children, while Chip is delayed by a violent political conflict in Lithuania, eventually arriving late after being attacked and robbed of all his savings. Denise inadvertently discovers that her father had known of her teenaged affair with his subordinate, and had kept his knowledge a secret to protect her privacy, at great personal cost. After a disastrous Christmas morning together, the three children are dismayed by their father's condition, and Alfred is finally moved into a nursing home.

As Alfred's condition deteriorates in care, Chip stays with Enid and visits his father frequently while dating a doctor, eventually having twins with her. Denise leaves Philadelphia and moves to New York to work at a new restaurant where she is much happier. Enid, freed of her responsibilities and long-time frustrations with Alfred, slowly becomes a more open-minded person, and enjoys a healthier involvement in her children's and grandchildren's lives, finally stating that she is ready to make some changes in her life.

Themes

The title of The Corrections refers most literally to the decline of the technology-driven economic boom of the late nineties. Franzen makes this clear at the beginning of the book's final chapter, also titled "The Corrections": 

(On a more abstract level, the title is an homage to William Gaddis' The Recognitions.)

This economic correction parallels the simultaneous "corrections" that Franzen's characters make to their own lives in the novel's final pages. Franzen has said that "the most important corrections of the book are the sudden impingements of truth or reality on characters who are expending ever larger sums of energy on self-deception or denial." Enid becomes more flexible in her worldview and less submissive to her husband's authority, and Chip begins a more mature relationship with a woman, simultaneously reconciling with his father. Gary, the only central character who fails to learn from his mistakes and grow during the course of the novel, loses a lot of money as technology stocks begin to decline.

Another key theme in the book is America's transition from an industrial economy to an economy based largely on the financial, high-tech and service sectors. Alfred, a railroad engineer with a pension and a deep loyalty to his company, embodies the old economic order of mid-twentieth century America. His children, a chef, an investment banker, and a professor/internet entrepreneur, embody the new economic order at the turn of the millennium. Franzen depicts this economic transition most concretely in his descriptions of Denise's workplace, an abandoned Philadelphia coal plant converted into a trendy, expensive restaurant.

The narrative of Chip's involvement with Gitanas' attempt to bring the country of Lithuania to the market – "lithuania.com" on the internet – comments on unrestrained capitalism and the privileges and power of the wealthy while meaningful distinctions between private and public sectors disappear. "The main difference between America and Lithuania, as far as Chip could see, was that in America the wealthy few subdued the unwealthy many by means of mind-numbing and soul-killing entertainments and gadgetry and pharmaceuticals, whereas in Lithuania the powerful few subdued the unpowerful many by threatening violence."

The book addresses conflicts and issues within a family that arise from the presence of a progressive debilitating disease of an elder. As Alfred's dementia and parkinsonism unfold mercilessly, they affect Enid and all three children, eliciting different and, over time, changing reactions. Medical help and hype – the latter in the form of the investigatory method “Corecktall” – do not provide a solution. At the end, Alfred refuses to eat and dies, the ultimate “correction” of the problem.

Reception 
The novel won the 2001 National Book Award for Fiction
and the 2002 James Tait Black Memorial Prize, was a finalist for the 2002 Pulitzer Prize, was nominated for the 2001 National Book Critics Circle Award for Fiction and the 2002 PEN/Faulkner Award, and was shortlisted for the 2003 International Dublin Literary Award. According to John Leonard, the novel explores the generation gap and the grasp of one generation on another in a way that reminds you of "why you read serious fiction in the first place". In 2005, The Corrections was included in TIME magazine's list of the 100 best English-language novels since 1923. In 2006, Bret Easton Ellis declared the novel "one of the three great books of my generation." In 2009, website The Millions polled 48 writers, critics, and editors, including Joshua Ferris, Sam Anderson, and Lorin Stein; the panel voted The Corrections the best novel since 2000 "by a landslide".

The novel was a selection of Oprah's Book Club in 2001. Franzen caused some controversy when he publicly expressed his ambivalence at his novel having been chosen by the club due to its inevitable association with the "schmaltzy" books selected in the past. As a result, Oprah Winfrey rescinded her invitation to him to appear on The Oprah Winfrey Show.

Entertainment Weekly put The Corrections on its end-of-the-decade "best-of" list, saying, "Forget all the Oprah hoo-ha: Franzen's 2001 doorstop of a domestic drama teaches that, yes, you can go home again. But you might not want to."

Style and interpretations
With The Corrections, Franzen moved away from the postmodernism of his earlier novels and towards literary realism. In a conversation with novelist Donald Antrim for BOMB Magazine, Franzen said of this stylistic change, "Simply to write a book that wasn't dressed up in a swashbuckling, Pynchon-sized megaplot was enormously difficult." Critics pointed out many similarities between Franzen's childhood in St. Louis and the novel, but the work is not an autobiography.  Franzen said in an interview that "the most important experience of my life ... is the experience of growing up in the Midwest with the particular parents I had. I feel as if they couldn’t fully speak for themselves, and I feel as if their experience—by which I mean their values, their experience of being alive, of being born at the beginning of the century and dying towards the end of it, that whole American experience they had—[is] part of me. One of my enterprises in the book is to memorialize that experience, to give it real life and form." The novel also focuses on topics such as the multi-generational transmission of family dysfunction and the waste inherent in today's consumer economy, and each of the characters "embody the conflicting consciousnesses and the personal and social dramas of our era." Influenced by Franzen's life, the novel in turn influenced it; during its writing, he said in 2002, he moved "away from an angry and frightened isolation toward an acceptance – even a celebration – of being a reader and a writer."

In a Newsweek feature on American culture during the George W. Bush administration, Jennie Yabroff said that despite being released less than a year into Bush's term and before the September 11 attacks, The Corrections "anticipates almost eerily the major concerns of the next seven years." According to Yabroff, a study of The Corrections demonstrates that much of the apprehension and disquiet that is seen as characteristic of the Bush era and post-9/11 America actually predated both. In this way, the novel is both characteristic of its time and prophetic of things to come; for Yabroff, even the controversy with Oprah, which saw Franzen branded an "elitist," was symptomatic of the subsequent course of American culture, with its increasingly prominent anti-elitist strain. She argues that The Corrections stands above later novels which focus on similar themes, because unlike its successors it addresses these themes without being "hamstrung by the 9/11 problem" which preoccupied Bush-era novels by writers such as Don DeLillo, Jay McInerney, and Jonathan Safran Foer.

Film adaptation 
In August 2001, producer Scott Rudin optioned the film rights to The Corrections for Paramount Pictures. The rights still have not yet been turned into a completed film.

In 2002, the film was said to be in pre-production, with Stephen Daldry attached to direct and dramatist David Hare working on the screenplay. In October 2002, Franzen gave Entertainment Weekly a wish-list for the cast of the film, saying, "If they told me Gene Hackman was going to do Alfred, I would be delighted. If they told me they had cast Cate Blanchett as [Alfred's daughter] Denise, I would be jumping up and down, even though officially I really don't care what they do with the movie."

In January 2005, Variety announced that, with Daldry presumably off the project, Robert Zemeckis was developing Hare's script "with an eye toward directing."  In August 2005, Variety confirmed that the director would definitely be helming The Corrections. Around this time, it was rumored that the cast would include Judi Dench as the family matriarch Enid, along with Brad Pitt, Tim Robbins and Naomi Watts as her three children. In January 2007, Variety wrote that Hare was still at work on the film's screenplay.

In September 2011, it was announced that Rudin and the screenwriter and director Noah Baumbach were preparing The Corrections as a "drama series project," to potentially co-star Anthony Hopkins and air on HBO. Baumbach and Franzen collaborated on the screenplay, which Baumbach would direct. In 2011, it was announced that Chris Cooper and Dianne Wiest would star in the HBO adaptation. In November 2011, it was announced that Ewan McGregor had joined the cast. In a March 7, 2012, interview, McGregor confirmed that work on the film was "about a week" in and noted that both Dianne Wiest and Maggie Gyllenhaal were among the cast members. But on May 1, 2012, HBO decided not to pick up the pilot for a full series.

Radio adaptation 
In January 2015, the BBC broadcast a 15-part radio dramatisation of the work. The series of 15-minute episodes, adapted by Marcy Kahan and directed by Emma Harding, also starred Richard Schiff (The West Wing), Maggie Steed (The Imaginarium of Doctor Parnassus), Colin Stinton (Rush, The Bourne Ultimatum) and Julian Rhind-Tutt (Lucy, Rush, Notting Hill). The series was part of BBC Radio 4's 15 Minute Drama "classic and contemporary original drama and book dramatisations".

References

External links
Jonathan Franzen's web page about The Corrections
Interview with Franzen in BOMB magazine issue 77
Listen to 2001 Interview with Jonathan Franzen, conducted by Terry Gross on NPR's Fresh Air
Answering Viewers' Questions at Big Think from April 14, 2008
The Complete Review: detailed summary and overview of reviews
BBC Radio programme page, 15 Minute Drama
James Wood review

2001 American novels
Novels by Jonathan Franzen
Novels set in the 1990s
Family saga novels
Farrar, Straus and Giroux books
Works originally published in The Paris Review
Novels adapted into radio programs
National Book Award for Fiction winning works
PEN/Faulkner Award for Fiction-winning works